Cooking Mama: World Kitchen is the second spin off game in the Cooking Mama series and the sequel to the 2007 Wii game Cooking Mama: Cook Off. The game was developed by Cooking Mama Limited. It was published by Taito in Japan, Majesco Entertainment in North America, and by 505 Games in PAL regions. The game was released exclusively on Wii in North America on November 18, 2008, in Japan on December 11, 2008, in Europe on February 6, 2009, and in Australia on June 4, 2009.

Gameplay
The goal of the game is to complete a meal of the player's choice. The player cooks in steps, for example, if making sushi, the player will cut the fish in one step, and do the rice in another. Every time a meal is finished, other meals are unlocked, and so are other characters, family and friends.

Reception

The game received "mixed" reviews according to video game review aggregator Metacritic.  In Japan, Famitsu gave it a score of two eights, one seven, and one six, for a total of 29 out of 40.

Notes

References

External links
Official Cooking Mama: World Kitchen Japanese website
Majesco's Official Cooking Mama: World Kitchen Website

505 Games games
2008 video games
Cooking Mama
Cooking video games
Taito games
Majesco Entertainment games
Wii-only games
Wii games
Simulation video games
Video games developed in Japan